This list contains people associated with the Florida Institute of Technology in Melbourne, Florida, including current and former college presidents, as well as notable alumni and faculty.

Alumni or attendees

Art, literature, and entertainment

Actors

Writers

Athletes

Government and law

Judges

Politics

Military

Science and technology

Astronauts

Scientists and engineers

Religious

International

Faculty and staff

Florida Institute of Technology presidents

Faculty

References

Florida Institute of Technology people